The Agfa Clack is a box camera produced by Agfa from 1954 to 1965. It was sold in North America as the Agfa Weekender.

It is a simple camera which was aimed at the mass market. About 1.65 million were produced, more than all other Agfa box camera models combined.

It uses 120 film, creating large 6x9 negatives that were usually contact printed (transferred directly from the negative onto photographic paper without enlarging).

It has only one shutter speed, and, depending on model, either a single f/11 f-stop or a choice of two.

The Agfa Clack played a central role in the 2013 novel, Klack, by German author Klaus Modick.

References
Hans-Dieter Götz: Box Cameras Made in Germany. Wie die Deutschen fotografieren lernten, 160 Seiten, vfv Verlag für Foto, Film und Video, Gilching, 2002,

External links
http://cameras.alfredklomp.com/clack/index.htm Information about Clack

120 film cameras
Agfa cameras
Cameras introduced in 1954